C. exasperatus may refer to a few different species.  The specific epithet  means 'roughened.'

 Callinectes exasperatus, the rugose swimming crab
 Chiton exasperatus, a marine mollusk in the genus Chiton
 Clavus exasperatus, the exasperating turrid, a sea snail
 Colostethus exasperatus, a synonym for Hyloxalus exasperatus, an Ecuadorean frog